This organization is unrelated to the conservative debating society of the same name associated with the University of Chicago Law School, the University of Virginia, and the London School of Economics.
In Canada, the Edmund Burke Society was a far-right organization formed by Paul Fromm, Don Andrews, and Leigh Smith in 1967 at the University of Toronto. The group presented a front of being anti-communist and promoting traditionalist values in order to recruit members into its real agenda. Its members soon became involved in violent confrontations with anti-war groups and leftists in Toronto.

The group's main focus was opposition to the New Left and other left wing tendencies that were prominent during the period and which the Burkers identified with Communism. During the 1968 federal election, they distributed leaflets accusing the new Liberal Prime Minister, Pierre Trudeau, of being a communist. The "Burkers" were involved in disrupting various left-wing events and rallies, often violently. In 1970, the group disrupted a speech by William Kunstler resulting in the Chicago Seven's lawyer drenching EBSer Paul Fromm with a pitcher of water. A melee between Burkers and Kunstler's supporters ensued and Fromm was knocked unconscious to the floor. According to a report by the Security Intelligence Review Committee, in 1971, one Burker, Geza Matrai, a Hungarian refugee, attacked Soviet Premier Alexei Kosygin during his visit to Canada. Matrai jumped on Kosygin's back, dragging him halfway to the ground before being arrested.

The group was named after the British member of Parliament Edmund Burke.

EBS members joined the small Ontario Social Credit Party in the early 1970s and took it over by 1972. The Social Credit Party of Canada expelled them resulting in two rival Ontario Social Credit parties existing for several years. In 1971, three of five Ontario Social Credit candidates in the 1971 provincial election were identified as EBS members. The EBS dissolved in 1972 as a result of major internal clashes over political metrology and fundamental ideology.

References

 "Freedom'56" Scarlett Deva Antaloczy  www.freedom56.org page 239-to-288

External links
 The Heritage Front: Into the Mainstream (The Paul Fromm Connection)
 The Heritage Front Affair: Report to the Solicitor General of Canada (Overview of the Extreme Right)
 From Marches to Modems: A Report on Organized Hate in Metro Toronto

1967 establishments in Ontario
Anti-communist organizations
Canadian anti-communists
Canadian far-right political movements
Edmund Burke